Jesús Esteban Quiroz Ortiz (born February 17, 1992) is a Mexican professional baseball infielder in the Chicago Cubs organization. He made his MLB debut in 2022 for the Cubs. He plays on the Mexico national baseball team.

Career

Tigres de Quintana Roo
Quiroz made his professional debut for the Tigres de Quintana Roo of the Mexican Baseball League in 2011. He played primarily at shortstop and second base.

Leones de Yucatan
The Tigres traded Quiroz to the Leones de Yucatan before the 2017 season.

Quiroz played for the Mexico national baseball team in the 2017 World Baseball Classic, and hit a leadoff home run for Mexico in the first game of Pool D. He went 4-for-6 with two home runs (one of them off major leaguer Yusmeiro Petit) and a double.  Following his participation in the WBC, Quiroz batted .293/.428/.488/.916 in for the Leones de Yucatán of the Mexican League. Quiroz registered more walks (64) than strikeouts (41) in 358 plate appearances.

Boston Red Sox
On November 22, 2017, Quiroz signed a minor league contract with the Boston Red Sox. He started the 2018 season with the Double-A Portland Sea Dogs, his first time playing professional baseball outside of Mexico. He played in 15 games before he was placed on the disabled list in late April for surgery for a sports hernia. On August 10, he was sent on a rehabilitation assignment with the Gulf Coast League Red Sox, then activated by Portland on August 24. Between the two teams he batted .283/.406/.547 in 106 at bats.

San Diego Padres
The Red Sox traded Quiroz to the San Diego Padres in exchange for pitcher Colten Brewer on November 20, 2018. Quiroz spent the 2019 season with the Triple-A El Paso Chihuahuas, playing primarily second base, hitting .271/.384/.539/.923 with 19 home runs and 66 RBIs.

Tampa Bay Rays
On March 26, 2020, the Padres traded Quiroz to the Tampa Bay Rays as the player to be named later in the December 2019 trade that sent Tommy Pham and Jake Cronenworth to San Diego in exchange for Hunter Renfroe and Xavier Edwards. The 2020 minor league season was cancelled due to the COVID-19 pandemic, but the Rays invited Quiroz to be one of the 60 players in their training pool. Quiroz played in 68 games in 2021 for the Triple-A Durham Bulls, hitting .268 with 12 home runs and 48 RBIs.

Chicago Cubs
On March 25, 2022, the Rays traded Quiroz to the Chicago Cubs in exchange for Harold Ramírez. Quiroz began the 2022 season with the Triple-A Iowa Cubs. The Cubs promoted him to the major leagues on September 17 and he made his major league debut that day. He was sent outright off the 40-man roster on November 11, 2022.

References

External links

1992 births
Living people
Algodoneros de Guasave players
Baseball players from Sonora
Cañeros de Los Mochis players
Chicago Cubs players
Durham Bulls players
El Paso Chihuahuas players
Florida Complex League Rays players
Gulf Coast Red Sox players
Iowa Cubs players
Leones de Yucatán players
Major League Baseball infielders
Major League Baseball players from Mexico
Mesa Solar Sox players
Mexican expatriate baseball players in the United States
Mexican League baseball second basemen
Mexican League baseball shortstops
Mexican League baseball third basemen
People from Ciudad Obregón
Portland Sea Dogs players
Tigres de Quintana Roo players
Venados de Mazatlán players
Yaquis de Obregón players
2017 World Baseball Classic players
2019 WBSC Premier12 players